Samuel Felton (Samuel Morse "Sam" Felton, Jr.; May 26, 1926 – December 24, 2015) was an American athlete. He competed in the men's hammer throw at the 1948 Summer Olympics and the 1952 Summer Olympics.  He graduated from Harvard University and Harvard Business School.

References

1926 births
2015 deaths
Athletes (track and field) at the 1948 Summer Olympics
Athletes (track and field) at the 1952 Summer Olympics
American male hammer throwers
Olympic track and field athletes of the United States
Place of birth missing
Harvard Crimson rowers
Harvard Business School alumni